Mattias Kent Moström (born 25 February 1983) is a Swedish professional footballer who plays as a right midfielder for SK Træff. He played most of his career for Norwegian Eliteserien club Molde. He started his career with AIK, before he made his senior debut with FC Café Opera. He later returned to AIK before he moved to Molde in 2007.

Career

Early career
Moström was born in Stockholm and started to play football at AIK at the age of six and was selected for the club's development squad during his youth. He transferred to FC Café Opera ahead of the 2001 season, where he made his senior debut. He played three seasons for the club.

AIK
In 2004, Moström returned to his old club AIK, where he signed a contract till the end of the 2007 season.

Moström made his debut in Allsvenskan when he came on as a substitute in the opening match of the 2004 season against Sundsvall. He started his first match for AIK against Halmstad in the fifth round, and soon became a regular in AIK's starting line-up. Moström scored his first goal in Allsvenskan when he scored the match-winning goal against Landskrona on 23 May 2004.

After the 2006 season, AIK's new head coach Rikard Norling told Moström that he wasn't a part of his future plans and that he was free to find himself a new club. Moström who had played for AIK for a total of 14 seasons, then stated that he wanted to move abroad so that he did not have to meet AIK in a match.

Molde
Mattias Moström signed a three-year contract with the Norwegian First Division club Molde in January 2007, despite being wanted by the Tippeligaen club Aalesund. He made his Molde debut on 9 April 2007 in the 2–3 win on away ground against Sogndal.

Moström signed a pre-contract with the Swedish club Kalmar FF in July 2011, and was going to join the club when his contract with Molde expired after the 2011 season. Moström did however change his mind, and asked Kalmar FF if they could destroy the contract, and instead he signed a new contract with Molde lasting till the end of the 2014 season. He made 27 appearances and scored three goals in the 2011 Tippeligaen season where Molde won the first top-flight title in club history. In 2012, after six seasons with Molde, Moström became the foreign player with the most matches for Molde. Moström played 28 games and scored five goals in the 2012 league season, where Molde succeeded in defending the league title. Molde won the Norwegian Cup in 2013, where Moström contributed in all games from the third round to the final. In July 2014, Moström and Molde agreed on a two-year contract extension that kept him at the club till the end of the 2016 season. In August 2016, his contract with Molde was extended to last till the end of the 2018 season. On 5 May 2019, Moström got his 250th appearance in Eliteserien, in the club's 2–1 win away against Haugesund. As of 1 December 2019, Moström has made 357 appearances for Molde, the fifth-highest number of appearances by any player for the club. Alongside Trond Strande and Vegard Forren, he is the only player to have appearances for Molde in 12 consecutive Eliteserien seasons.

In 2022 he made a comeback for Molde FK's city neighbors SK Træff.

Personal life
Moström's younger half-brother, Marcus West, is also a professional footballer. Ahead of the 2014 season, the two played against each other for the first time when Molde met AIK in a pre-season friendly match.

Career statistics

Honours
Molde
 Tippeligaen/Eliteserien: 2011, 2012, 2014, 2019
 Norwegian Cup: 2013, 2014

References

External links
 Player profile on official club website 

1983 births
Living people
Swedish footballers
Sweden under-21 international footballers
Sweden youth international footballers
AFC Eskilstuna players
AIK Fotboll players
Molde FK players
Allsvenskan players
Superettan players
Norwegian First Division players
Eliteserien players
Swedish expatriate footballers
Expatriate footballers in Norway
Swedish expatriate sportspeople in Norway
Association football midfielders
Footballers from Stockholm